"Champion" is a song by British rapper Chipmunk from Chipmunk's second studio album Transition (2011). It features American singer Chris Brown and was released as the second single from the album on 6 February 2011 in the United Kingdom. The song was written by Chipmunk and Chris Brown, and it was produced by Samuels. According to Chipmunk, he wants the listeners of the song to "feel like they were born a champion". The song was later added to the international deluxe edition of Brown's fourth album, F.A.M.E. (2011).

The song peaked at number 2 on the UK Singles Chart, becoming Chipmunk's second highest-charting single.

Background
Speaking in April 2011 to noted UK urban writer Pete Lewis - Assistant Editor of Blues & Soul - Chipmunk shed light on the background to the song and Chris Brown's involvement: "That was definitely a big learning experience for me - not just in terms of being an artist, but in terms of LIFE! Because, with Chris being on it, people were saying that they didn't wanna support the track before they'd even HEARD it! Which meant I really had to engage myself and find the inner strength to say 'Yo, I'm gonna go with this track REGARDLESS! Because I know what this song means to ME, I know that it means to CHRIS - and if it's from the heart then it can't go WRONG!'!"

Critical reception
Robert Copsey of Digital Spy gave the song a positive review stating: "Like a friend who cancels dinner plans five minutes after you've arrived at the restaurant, a British artist fleeing to the US is usually frustrating and, at times, unforgivable. Are we really that awful to be around? Anyway, on first glance we thought Chipmunk was destined to become our latest Hot 100-fixated expat, but, after a closer inspection, it's clear he's actually doing something rather more savvy. By drafting in Chris Brown while keeping his sound akin to previous hits, Chip's taken a best-of-both-worlds approach to this latest chart-botherer - a fist-clenching, anthemic midtempo electro-R&B stomper that ponders the glorious highs and depressive lows of fame over a 'Changes'-style piano line. "Some people wait their turn / Some people, but not me / I was born a champion," he insists with utter conviction. "Maybe I've just got GaGa on the brain, but could this be the harder, bloke-friendly version of 'Born This Way'?" .

Chart performance
On 10 February 2011, the song debuted at number fourteen in Ireland. In the United Kingdom, "Champion" debuted at number two on 12 February 2011. It was beaten to the top spot by a margin of less than 5% by Jessie J's "Price Tag", each having sold over 90,000 copies.

Remix
The official remix of the song features a new verse by Chipmunk, Chris Brown's verse & chorus and a verse by American rapper J. Cole. The remix was released on 5 February 2011.

Music video
The music video (directed by Colin Tilley) premiered on YouTube on 23 December 2010. Fellow British rapper Skepta, makes a cameo. The music video of the song's edited version premiered on YouTube on 18 March 2011.

In popular culture
 The song is featured as the theme of the WWE series Tough Enough on USA Network. 
 The song was featured in the tribute montage BBC made of Formula One World Champion Sebastian Vettel, when he won his second World Championship at Japan in 2011. 
 The song is on the soundtrack of the 2012 football video game Madden NFL 12.

Track listing
Digital download #1
 "Champion" (featuring Chris Brown) (Explicit Version) – 3:58
 "Champion" (featuring Chris Brown) (Clean Version) – 3:59

CD single / Digital download #2
 "Champion" (featuring Chris Brown) - 3:58
 "Power Trip" - 3:42

Digital download - Remix #1
 "Champion" (Ready For The Weekend Remix) - 6:00

Digital download - Remix #2
 "Champion" (Remix featuring Chris Brown & J. Cole) - 4:59

Charts

Weekly charts

Year-end charts

Certifications

Release history

References

2010 songs
2011 singles
Chipmunk (rapper) songs
Chris Brown songs
Music videos directed by Colin Tilley
Song recordings produced by Harmony Samuels
Songs written by Eric Bellinger
Songs written by Erika Nuri
Songs written by Chip (rapper)
Songs written by Chris Brown
Songs written by Harmony Samuels